The MG-050, also called Newton Penido, is a state highway located in the Brazilian state of Minas Gerais.

Route
MG-050 passes through the following municipalities:

Belo Horizonte
Betim
Juatuba
Mateus Leme
Itaúna 
Igaratinga
Carmo do Cajuru
Divinópolis
São Sebastião do Oeste
Itapecerica
Pedra do Indaiá
Formiga
Piumhi
Córrego Fundo
Pimenta
Capitólio
Passos
Itaú de Minas
Pratápolis
São Sebastião do Paraíso

References 

Highways in Minas Gerais